Keith Gorman (born 13 October 1966) is an English former footballer who played in the Football League as a winger for Colchester United, on loan from Ipswich Town, and for Darlington.

Career
Gorman was born in Bishop Auckland, but began his career as a youth with Ipswich Town in 1982. He was prolific during his youth spell with the club, scoring 59 goals in 41 appearances. He turned professional at the club in 1984, and played one reserve-team game, also scoring in that game.

He signed for Colchester United on loan from Ipswich in September 1986. He made one substitute appearance, his Football League debut, on 3 October at home to Wrexham, coming on for Nicky Chatterton who had dislocated his shoulder; Colchester won 2–1.

On his return to Ipswich, Gorman failed to break into the first-team squad, and joined Darlington permanently in January 1987. He made seven appearances for Darlington, scoring twice, during the latter half of the 1986–87 season. He later played for Brandon United and West Auckland Town.

References

1966 births
Living people
Sportspeople from Bishop Auckland
Footballers from County Durham
English footballers
Association football wingers
Ipswich Town F.C. players
Northampton Town F.C. players
Colchester United F.C. players
Darlington F.C. players
Brandon United F.C. players
West Auckland Town F.C. players
English Football League players